Big Creek is a stream in the U.S. state of Tennessee. It is a tributary to the Beech River.

Big Creek was so named for its relatively large size.

References

Rivers of Decatur County, Tennessee
Rivers of Henderson County, Tennessee
Rivers of Tennessee